The Helsen 22 is an American trailerable sailboat that was designed by Johannes "Jopie" Helsen as a cruiser and first built in 1971.

The design was later developed into the Watkins 23. The Apollo 21 sailboat was also built from the same tooling.

Production
The boat was the first design built by Helsen Yachts in Saint Petersburg, Florida, United States, starting in 1971, but it is now out of production.

Design
The Helsen 22 is a recreational keelboat, built predominantly of fiberglass, with wood trim. It has a masthead sloop rig with aluminum spars; a raked stem; a plumb transom; a transom-hung, kick-up rudder controlled by a tiller and a retractable swing keel. It displaces  and carries  of lead ballast. The boat has foam flotation and is unsinkable. It will self-right with the keel extended or retracted.

The design has sleeping accommodation for five people, with a double "V"-berth in the bow cabin, a drop-down dinette table that converts to a double berth in the main cabin and an aft quarter berth on the port side, under the cockpit. The galley is located on the port side admidships. The galley is equipped with a two-burner stove and a sink. The head is located in the bow cabin on the starboard side.

For sailing the design is equipped with jib roller reefing as standard equipment.

See also
List of sailing boat types

References

External links
Photo of a Helsen 22 sailing
Photo of a Helsen 22 with the pop-top open

Keelboats
1970s sailboat type designs
Sailing yachts
Trailer sailers
Sailboat type designs by Johannes "Jopie" Helsen
Sailboat types built by Universal Marine